In Greek mythology, the name Orchomenus may refer to:
Orchomenus, an Arcadian prince as one of the 50 sons of the impious King Lycaon either by the naiad Cyllene, Nonacris or by unknown woman. He was the founder and eponym of Orchomenus (Arcadia), as well as founder of Methydrium. One account called him father of Arcas. Orchomenus and his siblings were the most nefarious and carefree of all people. To test them, Zeus visited them in the form of a peasant. These brothers mixed the entrails of a child into the god's meal, whereupon the enraged king of the gods threw the meal over the table. Orchomenus was killed, along with his brothers and their father, by a lightning bolt of the god.
Orchomenus, a king, the father of Elara.
Orchomenus, son of Zeus and the Danaid Isonoe (Isione). He was the husband of Hermippe and legal father of Minyas whose biological father was Poseidon. In some accounts, Orchomenus was regarded as the son of Zeus and Hermippe instead.
Orchomenus, a son of Minyas and Phanosyra, thus grandson of the above (note though that there were multiple versions of Minyas' parentage). He succeeded to Minyas' power and had his domain, the Boeotian Orchomenus, named after himself. He received Hyettus who had fled Argos over the murder of Molurus, and assigned to him a tract of land. According to one source, Orchomenus died without issue, and his kingdom was handed over to Presbon, a son of Phrixus; in an alternate version though, he was father of Aspledon, Amphidocus and Clymenus, of whom the latter was his successor. He may be the Orchomenus who is given as father of Chloris, the consort of Ampycus.
Orchomenus, son of Eteocles and brother of Minyas, in a rare genealogy; essentially the same as the above.
Orchomenus, a son of Athamas and Themisto and brother of Sphincius according to Hyginus.
Orchomenus, one of the sons of Thyestes by a naiad whose flesh was served to their own father by Atreus. His two brothers were Aglaus and Calaeus.

Notes

References 

 Apollodorus, The Library with an English Translation by Sir James George Frazer, F.B.A., F.R.S. in 2 Volumes, Cambridge, MA, Harvard University Press; London, William Heinemann Ltd. 1921. ISBN 0-674-99135-4. Online version at the Perseus Digital Library. Greek text available from the same website.
 Dionysus of Halicarnassus, Roman Antiquities. English translation by Earnest Cary in the Loeb Classical Library, 7 volumes. Harvard University Press, 1937-1950. Online version at Bill Thayer's Web Site
Dionysius of Halicarnassus, Antiquitatum Romanarum quae supersunt, Vol I-IV. . Karl Jacoby. In Aedibus B.G. Teubneri. Leipzig. 1885. Greek text available at the Perseus Digital Library.
Gaius Julius Hyginus, Fabulae from The Myths of Hyginus translated and edited by Mary Grant. University of Kansas Publications in Humanistic Studies. Online version at the Topos Text Project.
 Pausanias, Description of Greece with an English Translation by W.H.S. Jones, Litt.D., and H.A. Ormerod, M.A., in 4 Volumes. Cambridge, MA, Harvard University Press; London, William Heinemann Ltd. 1918. . Online version at the Perseus Digital Library
 Pausanias, Graeciae Descriptio. 3 vols. Leipzig, Teubner. 1903.  Greek text available at the Perseus Digital Library.
 Pseudo-Clement, Recognitions from Ante-Nicene Library Volume 8, translated by Smith, Rev. Thomas. T. & T. Clark, Edinburgh. 1867. Online version at theio.com
 Stephanus of Byzantium, Stephani Byzantii Ethnicorum quae supersunt, edited by August Meineike (1790-1870), published 1849. A few entries from this important ancient handbook of place names have been translated by Brady Kiesling. Online version at the Topos Text Project.
Tzetzes, John, Book of Histories, Book I translated by Ana Untila from the original Greek of T. Kiessling's edition of 1826. Online version at theio.com
Sons of Lycaon
Family of Athamas
Princes in Greek mythology
Kings of Minyan Orchomenus
Kings in Greek mythology
Arcadian characters in Greek mythology
Boeotian characters in Greek mythology
Minyan characters in Greek mythology
Arcadian mythology